The Snow Foundation is a non-profit organisation operating in Canberra. It was established to assist those in need in the Canberra community whose needs are not covered by government sources. As of 2020, the main areas for which the Snow Foundation provides services are social welfare (including homelessness, domestic violence), lack of education/employment including future job opportunities, and health for indigenous Australians as well as aged care.

History
The Snow Foundation is a response to the long association the Snow family has had with the Canberra region, dating back to 1926 when E.R. Snow, the founders’ grandfather, came to Canberra to establish the Capital's first general store.

The Foundation is the creation of brothers Terry and George Snow who set it up in 1991 with the aim of helping those individuals and organisations that freely gave their time to help the less fortunate live fulfilling lives. Starting with an initial contribution of $1 million, the Foundation has provided financial help to a diverse range of organisations and individuals throughout Canberra and the surrounding region. The foundation now has over $100 million in capital

In the 29 years since it was established, The Snow Foundation has reached out to help more than 700 different organisations and individuals, providing over $29 million in funding which includes $850,000 to individuals.

References

Charities based in Australia
Organisations based in Canberra
Non-profit organisations based in the Australian Capital Territory